Labuan, Labuhan, or Pelabuhan may refer to:

Malaysia
 Labuan, a federal territory of Malaysia
 The Crown Colony of Labuan, when Labuan was ruled by the British
 Labuan (federal constituency), represented in the Dewan Rakyat (1986-today)
 Labuan (state constituency), formerly represented in the Sabah State Legislative Assembly (1967–1986)

Indonesia
 Labuan, Pandeglang, is a town (and kecamatan) of 56,313 people (as at mid 2021) in Pandeglang Regency of Banten Province
 Labuan Bajo is sometimes shown on maps simply as Labuan

Other
 , more than one Australian warship
 , a British frigate in service with the Royal Navy from 1944 to 1946
 The Pearl of Labuan, a character in Emilio Salgaris Sandokan books